Camagüey is a city and municipality in central Cuba and is the nation's third-largest city with more than 321,000 inhabitants. It is the capital of the Camagüey Province.

It was founded as Santa María del Puerto del Príncipe in 1514, by Spanish colonists on the northern coast and moved inland in 1528, to the site of a Taino village named Camagüey. It was one of the seven original settlements (villas) founded in Cuba by the Spanish. After Henry Morgan burned the city in the 17th century, it was redesigned like a maze so attackers would find it hard to move around inside the city.

The symbol of the city of Camagüey is the clayen pot or tinajón, used to capture rain water and keep it fresh. Camagüey is also the birthplace of Ignacio Agramonte (1841), an important figure of the Ten Years' War against Spain. A monument by Italian sculptor Salvatore Buemi, erected in the center of the area to Ignacio Agramonte, was unveiled by his wife in 1912. It is composed of an equestrian statue, reliefs in bronze that reveal fragments of the life of Agramonte, and a sculpture of a woman that symbolizes the motherland.

In July 2008, the old town was designated a UNESCO World Heritage Site, because of its irregular, maze-like city planning, its prominent role in early Spanish colonization and agriculture, and its rich architecture showing a variety of influences.

History

Camagüey was founded as Santa María del Puerto del Príncipe in 1514, by Spanish colonists led by Diego Velázquez de Cuéllar at a location now known as Nuevitas on the northern coast. It was one of the seven original settlements (villas) founded in Cuba by the Spanish. The settlement was moved inland in 1528 to the site of a Taíno village named Camagüey.

Between 1747 and 1753 Luis de Unzaga, then Captain Governor of Puerto Principe, rehabilitated the town, which was very deteriorated in the War of Jenkins' Ear, and Unzaga rebuilt the church of La Merced.

It was in 1898 when it received the current name of Camagüey, as a result of Spain's independence. The indigenous name was already used to refer to the region "El Camagüey" in reference to the local chief ('Cacique') Camagüebax, who exercised his command between the Tínima and Hatibonico rivers and was approved on that date for both the city and the province that had been created in 1878 as a military region for the republic in arms.

The new city was built with a confusing lay-out of winding alleys. There are many blind alleys and forked streets that lead to squares of different sizes. One explanation is that this was done by design, to make the city easier to defend from any raiders; by the same version, the reason that there is only one exit from the city was that should pirates ever return and succeed in entering the city, it would be possible for local inhabitants to entrap and kill them. However, locals dispute this reasoning as a myth, asserting that in truth the city developed without planning, and that winding streets developed out of everybody wanting to stay close to their local church (the city has 15 of them).

Geography
Located on a plain in the middle of its province, the municipality borders with Vertientes, Florida, Esmeralda, Sierra de Cubitas, Minas, Sibanicú and Jimaguayú.

Demographics
In 2004, the municipality of Camagüey had a population of 324,921.

Culture

The symbol of the city of Camagüey is the clay pot or tinajón, used to capture rain water to be used later, keeping it fresh. Clay pots are everywhere, some as small as a hand, some large enough for two people to stand up in, either as monuments or for real use. A local legend is that if you drink water from a "tinajón", you will stay in Camagüey ("Quien tome agua del tinajón, en Camagüey se queda"), meaning that if you meet a Camagüeyana girl, you will fall in love with her and never leave. The main secondary education institutions are the University of Camagüey and the Instituto Pedagógico de Camagüey.

Infrastructure

Street layout
The old city layout resembles a real maze, with narrow, short streets always turning in one direction or another. After Henry Morgan burned the city in the 17th century, it was designed like a maze so attackers would find it hard to move around inside the city.

Transport

Camagüey counts an important railway station on the main Havana-Santiago line with connections to minor lines. The station lies in the central "Avenida Van Horne", at the corner with "Avenida Finlay". The city is crossed by the Carretera Central highway and counts a beltway. The A1 motorway, that will link Havana to Guantánamo, and partly built, is in project phase in the city area.

Airports
Camagüey has its own international airport, Ignacio Agramonte International Airport located in the north-eastern suburb. Most tourists going to or leaving the Beach of Santa Lucía do so through this airport.

Climate
According to the Köppen Climate Classification system, Camagüey has a tropical savanna climate, abbreviated Aw on climate maps. Since Cuba is a hotspot for tropical cyclones, it has been affected many times, like in 1932, with the 1932 Cuba hurricane. Afternoon temperatures are hot and morning temperatures mild to warm throughout the year. Rain peaks during June and is at its lowest during February.

Sport 
The local baseball club is Camagüey, nicknamed Alfareros, and its home ground is the Estadio Cándido González. The association football club is FC Camagüey and its home ground is the Estadio Patricio Lumumba.

Education

Instituto Pre-Universitario Vocacional de Ciencias Exactas

Although it is not the only high school in the City, the Pre-Universitario, sometimes referred to as "Vocational School" but formally known as "Instituto Pre-Universitario Vocacional de Ciencias Exactas" (IPVCE) Máximo Gómez Báez :es:Instituto Preuniversitario Vocacional de Ciencias Exactas – or, in English, Vocational Pre-University Institute of Exact Sciences Máximo Gómez Báez – is the largest of its kind in the province of Camagüey. The size of the institution qualifies it as a "learning city".
This center is homologous to others existing in the rest of the country's provinces. Students usually form close bonds and lasting friendships while at the institution, but family bonds sometimes suffer and "traditional" moral attitudes tend to shift as teenagers spend weeks away from their family.
To be admitted into the IPVCE, students must take an entrance exam after completing the preparation of the Basic Secondary Education (7th to 9th grade). During the following three years they receive intensive preparation in order to gain acceptance to college.

Other high schools
What we know in United States as High Schools (9-12 grade), in Cuba is called Secundaria from (7-9 grade) and Pre-Universitario from (10-12 grade). Some relevant Secundarias in Camagüey are La Avellaneda, Torre Blanca, Javier de la Vega, Ana Betancourt de Mora, Ignacio Agramonte, and many others. In Camagüey city, there are other high schools, as well as schools for athletes (ESPA, and EIDE), for artists (The School of Art), and the Military High School "Camilo Cienfuegos" (also known as "Camilitos", in honor of Camilo Cienfuegos, hero of the Cuban Revolution).

University
The University of Camagüey, with engineering and basic and humanitarian sciences programs, is located in the city. There are a separate university college for medical education (Carlos J Finlay University of Medical Science). Since 2016, the University of Camaguey is a blending between Sports University and Pedagogical Sciences University, counting over 12 000 students and 3 000 professors.

Notable residents
Camagüey is the birthplace of professional boxer Luis Ortiz (1979).

Camagüey is also the birthplace of Ignacio Agramonte (1841), an important figure of the Ten Years' War against Spain between 1868 and 1878. Agramonte drafted the first Cuban Constitution in 1869, and later, as a Major General, formed the fearsome Camagüey cavalry corps that had the Spaniards on the run. He died in combat on May 11, 1873; his body was burned in the city because the Spanish feared the rebels would attack the city to recover his body. The Agromonte cavalry regiment of the Ejercito Libertador during the Cuban War of Independence was named after him. This regiment was set up by another notable Camagüey native, Lope Recio Loynaz, who became the first Governor of the Province of Camagūey during the Republic of Cuba.

The outline of Ignacio Agramonte's horseback statue in the Park that bears his name is a symbol of Camagüey. It was set there in 1911, uncovered by his widow, Amalia Simoni.

Visial artists include José Iraola, a contemporary painter who was born in Camagüey, on September 19, 1961; sculptor Roberto Estopiñán, born in Camagüey in 1921; and artist Juan Boza, born in Camagüey in 1941.

Poets and writers include Brígida Agüero y Agüero (1837-1866), Domitila García Doménico de Coronado (1847-1938), Emelina Peyrellade Zaldívar (1842-1877) and "The Poet of the Revolution" Raúl Rivero (1945-2021). A street in the city has been named for Agüero.

The city is the birthplace of Major League Baseball Hall of Fame member Atanasio Perez Rigal (Tony Pérez), who won two World Series titles with the Cincinnati Reds and was the 1967 All Star Game MVP.

The city is also the birthplace of the Cuban national poet Nicolás Guillén, and of Carlos J. Finlay, an outstanding physician and scientist, who first identified the Aedes aegyptis mosquito as the vector of yellow fever.

Camagüey is also the hometown of volleyball player Mireya Luis, Gertrudis Gomez de Avellanada (poet), Silvestre de Balboa (1563–1649, writer), Salvador Cisneros Betancourt, Marqués de Santa Lucia (Cuban patriot, signatory of the Guaimaro Constitution of 1869 and President of the Cuban Republic in Arms).

Father José Olallo Valdés worked there, and was beatified in the city on November 29, 2008.

Olympic champion amateur boxer at 75 kg in Sydney 2000 was Jorge Gutiérrez Espinosa, born on 18 September 1975 in Camagüey.

It is the birthplace of the Cuban writer Severo Sarduy, a member of the European intellectual community that consolidated in the 1960s behind Tel Quel, a journal of critical thought. Sarduy, censored in Cuba throughout the 20th century, lived in Paris as an exile from 1960 until his death in 1993. He holds the position within literary history of having reformulated the transatlantic reconfigurations of the Hispanic Baroque aesthetic under the term "Neobaroque".

Gallery

See also

List of cities in Cuba
Municipalities of Cuba
University of Camagüey

References

Bibliography

External links

 History, architecture, art, and traditions of Camagüey, Cuba
 Camagüey, Cuba: Essays, monographs, legends, poems, images
 Madison-Camagüey Sister City Association
 Links to sites offering Casa Particular in Camaguey
 Camaguey City Map
 Historic Centre of Camagüey by UNESCO
 Camagüey Pays Homage to Maceo and Che June 15, 2009
 Medicine & Health Anniversaries related to Camaguey by Camagüeyanos
   The most important Camaguey Beach
   The "Maximo Gomez" Vocational School.

 
Cities in Cuba
Populated places in Camagüey Province
Populated places established in 1514
1510s establishments in the Spanish West Indies
World Heritage Sites in Cuba
1514 establishments in the Spanish Empire